Sunny Side is an unincorporated community in Waller County, Texas, United States. According to the Handbook of Texas, the community had an estimated population of 120 in 2000.

References

Unincorporated communities in Waller County, Texas
Unincorporated communities in Texas